Delwar Hossain Khan (1947 – November 3, 2020) was a Jatiya Party (Ershad) politician and the former Member of Parliament of Narsingdi-2.

Career
Khan was elected to parliament from Narsingdi-2 as a Jatiya Party candidate in 1988.

He was also President of the Bangladesh Labour Federation and Executive Council Secretary of the Bangladesh Institute of Labour Studies.

References

2020 deaths
Jatiya Party politicians
Bangladeshi trade unionists
4th Jatiya Sangsad members
1947 births